Scherenberg is a German surname. Notable people with the surname include:

 Hans Scherenberg (1910–2000), German engineer and executive
 Rolf Scherenberg (1897–1961), German general
 Rudolf II von Scherenberg ( 1401–1495), German bishop

German-language surnames